Bonangi is a village panchayat in Gantyada mandal of Vizianagaram district, Andhra Pradesh, India.

There is a post office at Bonangi.

References

Villages in Vizianagaram district